Crown of Arthain is a 1980 video game published by Micro Lab.

Contents
Crown of Arthain is a two-player fantasy game in which the board, a hex map drawn in hi-res graphics with features such as rivers, forests, and a mountain range down the middle, is home for two princes searching for their father's crown.

Reception
John Morrison reviewed Crown of Arthain in The Space Gamer No. 49. Morrison commented that "Crown of Arthain would have made a fair two-player game if the monster frequency was reduced drastically. Also, the price is a tad high. As a one-player game it has nothing to recommend it. I recommend it as-is only to rich gamers who'll buy anything."

References

External links
Softalk

1980 video games
Apple II games
Apple II-only games
Cooperative video games
Role-playing video games
Split-screen multiplayer games
Video games developed in the United States